Nathan C. Irby (born 1931 or 1932) is an American former politician in the state of Maryland. He served in the Maryland State Senate as a Democrat from the 45th district from 1982 to 1995.

References

Living people
Year of birth missing (living people)